Gerardo Cornejo Murrieta (1937–2014)  was a writer born in a community called Tarachi in the municipality of Arivechi, Sonora, Mexico in 1937. His works reflect his love for his home state, calling himself a "tarachilango", although his career obliged him to live for a long time in Mexico City.

He studied literature at the Universidad Nacional Autónoma de México, and was a literary expert who presented at academic institutions and conferences in various parts of the world. In 1982, he founded the Colegio de Sonora and was its dean on several occasions. He was the co-ordinator of the Sub-Comité Regional del Noroeste de la Comisión Nacional México, affiliated with UNESCO.  His works include short stories, operas, essays and novels. Major works include La sierra y el viento, El solar de los silencios, Cuéntame uno, Las dualidades fecundas, Voz viva de México and Como temiendo al olvido. The government of Sonora has named one of the literary prizes that it sponsors after him.

References

1937 births
2014 deaths
20th-century Mexican dramatists and playwrights
20th-century Mexican poets
Mexican male poets
Mexican male dramatists and playwrights
20th-century Mexican male writers